Saša Lošić "Loša" (born 19 July 1964) is a Bosnian recording artist. He initially rose to prominence as the lead vocalist of the Bosnian-based music act Plavi orkestar, which is one of the most popular music bands of the former Yugoslav Pop and Rock scene.

He remains one of the most recognizable composers of the Balkans, and one of the most prominent musicians of the Balkan music scene. He lives in Sarajevo, Bosnia and Herzegovina.

Work
Lošić is a composer of often folk-inspired pop, as well as theatre scores (Romeo and Juliet, Elvise de luxe, Lemonade, Mother Courage), The Bacchae, documentary and feature film scores. His recent work includes movies like Gori vatra, Kajmak i marmelada, Days and Hours, Borderline Lovers and establishing his new Saša Lošić Film Orchestra which had its world premiere at the 10th jubilee Sarajevo film festival with gala concerts at the National Theatre in Sarajevo.

He is the composer, singer, and arranger of the band Plavi orkestar (Blue Orchestra), one of the most popular bands on the territory of former Yugoslavia. Plavi orkestar is described by music encyclopedias as one of the "cultural phenomenons of the 1980s and 1990s" (5 million copies sold). The band has remained popular to date, with 10 albums and more than 1500 concerts worldwide.

In his feature film scores, Lošić has cooperated with numerous talented musicians and singers from across Europe, including: 
Candan Ercetin - one of the greatest stars of Turkish music
Vlatko Stefanovski - renowned Macedonian guitarist
Momčilo Bajagić Bajaga - famous Serbian rock musician
Jovan Kolundžija - internationally acclaimed violinist from Belgrade
Usnija Redžepova, Tanja Ribič, Severina, Rade Šerbedžija, Halid Bešlić, Šerif Konjević, Dado Topić, Zdravko Čolić, Branko Đurić, Helena Blagne - singers

Selected filmography
Welcome to Sarajevo / 1996 (songwriter)
Outsider / 1997
Zvenenje v glavi / 2002 (awarded for Best film score, Portoroz film festival, Slovenia, 2002)
Gori vatra / 2003  (awarded for best film score, "Davorin", Bosnia and Herzegovina, 2004)
Kajmak i marmelada / 2003
Sve džaba / 2006 (songwriter)
Petelinji Zajtrk / 2007
Teško je biti fin / 2007
Agape / 2007
Vratiće se rode / 2007
Rode u magli / 2009
Orkestar aka Orchestra / 2011
Šanghaj / 2012
Adria Blues / 2013
Žigosani u reketu / 2019

References

External links

Official web site

1964 births
Living people
Musicians from Banja Luka
Yugoslav musicians
20th-century Bosnia and Herzegovina male singers
Bosnia and Herzegovina rock musicians
21st-century Bosnia and Herzegovina male singers
Bosnia and Herzegovina rock singers
Bosnia and Herzegovina film score composers
Male film score composers
New Primitivism
Plavi orkestar albums